was a Japanese daimyō of the early Edo period, who served the Tokugawa clan. He was the half-brother of Tokugawa Ieyasu. His father was Hisamatsu Toshikatsu and his mother was Odai no Kata, Tokugawa Ieyasu's mother.

|-

|-

Samurai
Daimyo
1560 births
1624 deaths
Hisamatsu clan
Hisamatsu-Matsudaira clan
Deified Japanese people